Charles Frithiof Johnson (January 31, 1887 – September 17, 1967) was an American wrestler who competed in the 1920 Summer Olympics. He was born in Göteborg. In 1920, he won the bronze medal in the freestyle wrestling middleweight class after winning the bronze medal match against Angus Frantz.

References

External links
 

1887 births
1967 deaths
Wrestlers at the 1920 Summer Olympics
American male sport wrestlers
Olympic bronze medalists for the United States in wrestling
Medalists at the 1920 Summer Olympics
Swedish emigrants to the United States